Al-Tanukhi is a nisba, and may refer to:

Sahnun or Sa'id al-Tanukhi, 9th century qadi
Mansur ibn Abd al-Rahman al-Tanukhi, 9th century Abbasid governor of Yemen
Al-Sayyid al-Tanukhi, 15th century Druze theologian

Nisbas